Ethmia iphicrates is a moth in the family Depressariidae first described by Edward Meyrick in 1922. It is found in Kenya.

The forewings are white with black markings: an irregular elongate spot along the basal fifth of the costa, an irregular transverse fasciate blotch from the dorsum at one-fourth, its apex reaching the extremity of this and a streak along the dorsum from this to three-fourths, with an irregular projection before the middle. There is a broad irregular converging fasciae from the costa before the middle and at four-fifths uniting below the middle and continued to the dorsum at two-thirds. There is a large dot beneath the costa beyond the middle, and sometimes a slender costal streak between these. There is also a transverse fasciate subterminal blotch confluent above with the preceding fascia, and also confluent with a triangular apical spot. There is a large pre-tornal dot, and a marginal series around the posterior part of the costa and termen. The hindwings are grey.

References

Moths described in 1922
iphicrates